Patricia Conde Galindo (born 5 October 1979) is a Spanish actress, comedian, TV presenter and model.

She is the second of three siblings (Nacho and Rubén Conde) and she started to work as a model when she was 14 years old. In 1999 she took part in Miss Spain as Miss Palencia and soon after, she started to work in television. She started to be known in the beginnings from her collaboration as a reporter in the TV show El informal. Since then she has worked in several TV shows. She presented Sé lo que hicisteis....

In 2019 she replaced Silvia Abril in the TV programme Cero en Historia.

TV
El informal, Telecinco (2000-2002).
El club de la comedia, Canal+
Lady Kaña, Telemadrid (2004).
Un domingo cualquiera, TVE (2004) with Ramón García.
Nuestra mejor canción, TVE (2004) with Concha García Campoy.
Splunge, TVE (2005).
7 días al desnudo, Cuatro (2005–2006).
Sé lo que hicisteis..., la Sexta (2006–2011), with Ángel Martín, before called Sé lo que hicisteis la última semana.
 BuenAgente as Paula Noval.
Ciento y la madre, Cuatro (2014).
Killer Karaoke, Cuatro (2014), with Florentino Fernández.
Los poderes extraordinarios del cuerpo humano, #0  (2017).
Gym Tony, Cuatro (2014-2016).
Wifileaks, #0  (2018–2019).
Dar cera, pulir #0, #0  (2019–2020).
Nadie al volante, #0  (2021- ).
LOL: Si te ríes, pierdes, Prime Video (2022).
MasterChef Celebrity (2022).

Theatre
5 mujeres.com
Noche de cómicos
Los 39 escalones (adaptation of The 39 Steps by Alfred Hitchcock)

Filmography
La Kedada
Tweester Links
Pancho, el perro millonario as  Patricia (2014).
Despicable Me 2 Spanish voice of  Lucy Wilde (2013).

Bibliography
Lady Kaña, 2004
El libro de Sé lo que hicisteis...

References

External links

 
 

1979 births
Living people
People from Valladolid
Actresses from Castile and León
Spanish women comedians
Spanish film actresses
Spanish stage actresses
Spanish television actresses
Spanish voice actresses
Spanish television presenters
Spanish women television presenters
Spanish stand-up comedians
21st-century Spanish actresses